Kholat may refer to:

The tomb of Kholat, daughter of Husayn ibn Ali and great granddaughter of Muhammad, in Baalbek
Kholat Syakhl, a mountain in Russia
Kholat (video game), a 2015 video game named after the mountain which the Dyatlov Pass incident took place